Fionn Loch is a small irregular-shaped shallow freshwater loch, on a north-west to south-east orientation that is located 3 miles southeast of Lochinver in the Assynt district of Sutherland in Scotland. The loch is located in an area known as the Assynt-Coigach National Scenic Area, one of 40 such areas in Scotland.

Geography
Fionn Loch is part of the Fionn Loch drainage system and is fed with water from River Ledbeg which drains Loch Urigill, due south-by-south east and Loch Borralan, to the east of Urigill. Loch Veyatie directly south, drains through Uidh Fheàrna, a slow-moving channel into Fionn Loch. The drainage system was once a large lake, Loch Suilven that is now made up of Cam Loch, Veyatie and Fionn Loch. A vast number of lochs and lochans surround Fionn Loch, the biggest is the large irregular-shaped Loch Sionascaig along with Inverpolly Forest directly south.

Overlooking the loch to the north-west is the imposing hulk of the mountains of Suilven at 731 meters. Almost directly south of the loch is Cùl Mòr at 849m and Drumrunie Forest. To the far north-west is Drumrunie Forest.

Walking
Fionn Loch is remote and can be reached from a route that starts from Inverkirkaig, this route reaches the bealach from the south, passing Kirkaig Falls on the way.

Gallery

References

Freshwater lochs of Scotland
Kirkaig Basin
Sites of Special Scientific Interest in Scotland